These are the official results of the Men's 5.000 metres at the 1976 Summer Olympics in Montreal, Quebec, Canada. The final was held on Friday July 30, 1976, after the three qualifying heats were run on Wednesday July 28, 1976.

Summary
At first, the Soviet Union's Enn Sellik led this final, but then he let the other Soviet runner, Boris Kuznetsov, pass him.  Before 400 metres, one of the pre-race favourites, Britain's Brendan Foster, took the lead.  He led the field through 1,000 metres in 2:41.25 and at 2,000 metres in 5:26.39.  After 2,100 metres, the three-time Olympic champion Lasse Virén of Finland passed Foster, but surprisingly slowed the pace down.  He jogged the next two laps in the lead, passing 3,000 metres in 8:16.23.  At once after 3,000 metres, Foster accelerated into the lead, sprinting the next 200 metres in about 30 seconds.  After that burst of speed, he slowed down, and was passed by West Germany's Klaus-Peter Hildenbrand before 3,400 metres.  At that point, Norway's Knut Kvalheim rose to the second place.  Around 3,700 metres, Finland's Pekka Päivärinta dropped from the leading group.  Before 3,800 metres, Virén accelerated into the second place.  After 3,900 metres, Hildenbrand let Virén pass him on purpose.  At 4,000 metres, Virén led in 10:55.41.  Paul Geis of the United States lost touch with the leading group.  After 4,100 metres, also Belgium's Willy Polleunis dropped from Virén's pace.  Around 4,250 metres, Kuznetsov tripped on the left leg of New Zealand's Rodney Dixon, and fell to the track, unable to continue the race because of his injury.  Due to this incident, Sellik, West Germany's Detlef Uhlemann and Norway's Knut Kvalheim began to drop from the leading group.  Portugal's Aniceto Silva Simoes caught the six leaders before 4,400 metres.  On the following home straight, Polleunis passed Sellik and began to approach Kvalheim and Uhlemann.  At 4,600 metres, Virén led the race, followed by Britain's Ian Stewart and Foster, New Zealand's Dixon, West Germany's Hildenbrand, New Zealand's Dick Quax, and Portugal's Simoes.  The Portuguese runner dropped from Virén's pace in the front bend, while Polleunis accelerated past Uhlemann and Kvalheim.  On the final back straight, Virén visibly picked up his speed, dropping Stewart from the second place to the sixth place by 4,800 metres.  At that point, Virén led the race by around half a metre, threatened by Dixon and Hildenbrand.  Foster was sprinting in the fourth place, followed by Quax.  On the final bend, Quax furiously kicked past Foster, Dixon and Hildenbrand, and drew nearly level with Virén before the home straight.  The Finnish Olympic champion was still able to accelerate, however, leaving Quax with the silver medal.  Hildenbrand assured the bronze medal for himself by lunging across the finish line, relegating Dixon in the fourth place.  Foster lost to Dixon by nearly 0.7 seconds, finishing fifth.  On the final bend, Polleunis had kicked past Stewart, but on the home straight, he was unable to seriously threaten any of the five leading runners.  (Matti Hannus, The Montreal Olympic Book / Montrealin olympiateos, Finland, 1976;  Antero Raevuori, Lasse Virén - The Guilded Spikes / Kullatut piikkarit, Finland, 1976;  three YouTube videos on this final.)  (See also this final race's full video:  1976 Montreal Olympics 5000m from Arthur Lydiard  https://www.youtube.com/watch?v=t3PehlOMyAM&t=637s.)

Final

Qualifying heats

References

External links
 Official Report
 Results

 
5000 metres at the Olympics
Men's events at the 1976 Summer Olympics